Uaiuara is a genus of huntsman spiders that was first described by C. Rheims in 2013.

Species
 it contains seven species, found in South America and Panama:
Uaiuara amazonica (Simon, 1880) (type) – Northern South America
Uaiuara barroana (Chamberlin, 1925) – Panama
Uaiuara dianae Rheims, 2013 – Peru
Uaiuara jirau Rheims, 2013 – Brazil
Uaiuara ope Rheims, 2013 – Peru, Brazil
Uaiuara palenque Rheims, 2013 – Ecuador
Uaiuara quyguaba Rheims, 2013 – Brazil

See also
 List of Sparassidae species

References

Araneomorphae genera
Sparassidae
Spiders of Central America
Spiders of South America